"I'm Gonna Let My Heart Do the Walking" is a disco-styled soul single composed by the Holland brothers Eddie and Brian, members of the former Holland–Dozier–Holland team and was released as a single by Motown vocal group The Supremes in 1976 on the Motown label. It was the first single since "Your Heart Belongs to Me" in 1962 to feature four Supremes. It is also notable for being the last top forty single the group would score before they disbanded in 1977.

Overview

Recording
By 1976, the Supremes were four years without a top 40 recording and were constantly changing group members. After departures from Jean Terrell, Lynda Laurence and Cindy Birdsong - two times within four years - Mary Wilson struggled to keep the group going. After hiring Scherrie Payne, the group found themselves in search of a group member again after Birdsong left due to problems with the group's management team, led by Wilson's husband Pedro Ferrer. After Birdsong split in early 1976, Wilson eventually found another former Wonderlove background singer, multi-vocal talent Susaye Greene to complete the trio again. All of the tracks had been completed with Birdsong, but Greene was brought in to overdub her vocals on two tracks. Among those two were "I'm Gonna Let My Heart Do the Walking". Greene added in a high register vocal reminiscent of her former Wonderlove member Deniece Williams which again made it a different Supremes recording than they were used to. With Greene in the lineup adding in high vocals, Wilson comfortably in the lower vocal regions and Payne with a commanding soprano lead.

Reception
Released in March 1976, the single caught buzz among the group's disco fan base as well as pop and R&B radio, who had since 1973 been shunning from Supremes singles much or less blamed for the dismal promotion by Motown Records' staff. Because of the return of the Holland brothers to Motown and their reunion with the Supremes, hype was created for the single and it soon led to a rare hit for the group heading into the autumn of their heyday. In the UK, Record Mirror published, 'Still searching for a definite sound maybe it could be high vocals with a shuffling Holland - Dozier rhythm. No, of course it's not, but they're in the country, the vocal delivery is excellent and the BBC playing are it?' The single eventually peaked at number 40 on the Billboard Hot 100, number 25 on the R&B singles chart, and hit number three on Billboard's disco chart. It was also the Supremes' last of thirty-three singles to hit the top 40 nearly thirteen years after first hitting the top 40 with "When the Lovelight Starts Shining Through His Eyes". Less than eighteen months after this single's release, the Supremes officially disbanded.

Personnel
Lead vocals by Scherrie Payne and Susaye Greene
Background vocals by Scherrie Payne, Mary Wilson, Cindy Birdsong
Produced by Brian Holland and Eddie Holland

Charts

Weekly charts

Year-end charts

References

1976 singles
The Supremes songs
Songs written by Eddie Holland
Songs written by Brian Holland
Motown singles
Song recordings produced by Brian Holland
Song recordings produced by Edward Holland Jr.